Singletary-Reese-Robinson House, also known as Woodlawn, is a historic home located at Laurel Park, Henderson County, North Carolina. It was built in 1912, and is a two-story, "L"-form, Rustic Revival style log dwelling. It has a two-story rear wing addition and features a hip-roof wraparound porch. Also on the property are the contributing spring (1912), barn (1912), and a 19th-century log spring house.

It was listed on the National Register of Historic Places in 2010.

References

Houses on the National Register of Historic Places in North Carolina
Houses completed in 1912
Houses in Henderson County, North Carolina
National Register of Historic Places in Henderson County, North Carolina
1912 establishments in North Carolina